Jane Lane may refer to:
 Jane Lane, Lady Fisher (c. 1626-1689), helped Charles II of England to escape in 1651
 Jane Lane (author) (1905-1978), British historical novelist
 Jane Lane (Daria), fictional character on the MTV cartoon show Daria